Pisarissos was a town of ancient Pamphylia or of Cilicia, inhabited during Roman times. Its name does not occur in ancient authors, but is inferred by epigraphic and other evidence.

Its site is located near Cavurbeleni, in Asiatic Turkey.

References

Populated places in ancient Cilicia
Populated places in ancient Pamphylia
Former populated places in Turkey
Roman towns and cities in Turkey
History of Antalya Province